The Football Association Challenge Cup, commonly known as the FA Cup, is a knockout competition in English association football. It is the oldest football competition in the world, having commenced in 1871. The Cup is organised by The Football Association, the governing body of the sport in England, and is open only to clubs playing in FA-affiliated leagues in the modern era, all of which are based in England, although a number of Welsh clubs have taken part. Several teams from Scotland have also entered, primarily in the competition's early years.

The first Scottish club to enter was Queen's Park in Glasgow, who accepted an invitation to take part in the first competition after a number of the clubs which had originally entered withdrew. Queen's Park was by far the dominant force in Scottish football, and no other team had even managed to score a goal against them. Because of a combination of byes and the withdrawal of opponents, "Queen's" reached the semi-finals without playing a match, but after holding Wanderers to a draw the Scottish club was forced to withdraw, as the funds could not be raised to return for a replay. The following season Queen's Park entered the competition again and, to reduce the travelling expenses required to take part in a competition in which virtually every other team was based in the home counties surrounding London, were afforded byes all the way to the semi-finals. At that stage the club was drawn against Oxford University, but the Scots withdrew from the competition, although one account states that Queen's in fact beat Oxford, but then withdrew as the team could not afford to travel to London for the final. In 1873, the newly formed Scottish Football Association launched the Scottish Cup, but Queen's Park continued to enter the FA Cup draw, although for unknown reasons the club withdrew each time without playing.

In 1883, Queen's returned to the FA Cup and reached the final, scoring resounding wins over Crewe Alexandra (10–0) and Manchester F.C. (15–0) en route, only to be defeated by Blackburn Rovers. The match against Manchester was the first FA Cup tie to be staged in Scotland, hosted at Titwood, the home of Clydesdale Cricket Club. A year later Queens met Blackburn Rovers in the final once again, but Rovers won again. The 1885–86 competition saw the first entries by other Scottish clubs, as Queen's were joined by Partick Thistle, Third Lanark, Rangers and Heart of Midlothian; but Rangers and Hearts withdrew without playing a match. These clubs all returned for the 1886–87 competition, along with newcomers Renton and Cowlairs.

In 1887, the Scottish Football Association banned its members from taking any further part in the FA Cup. No more Scottish clubs participated until Gretna F.C. entered the competition in the 1980s. Because the town of Gretna is close to the border, the local football club had opted to play in the English football league system and by the 1980s had reached the Northern Premier League, making the team eligible to enter the FA Cup. Gretna played in the qualifying rounds of the FA Cup for nineteen seasons, and reached the first round proper twice, until the club joined the Scottish Football League in 2002.

Participation of Scottish clubs by season

See also
 Non-English football clubs in the FA Cup - a full list of all clubs from outside England that have competed in the FA Cup
 Berwick Rangers F.C. - a club geographically located in England, but which plays in the Scottish league system (and thus the Scottish Cup)

References

FA Cup
FA Cup
Scottish football clubs in the FA Cup
Scottish football clubs in the FA Cup